Marilda A. Oliveira Sotomayor (born March 13, 1944) is a Brazilian mathematician and economist known for her research on auction theory and stable matchings. She is a member of the Brazilian Academy of Sciences, Brazilian Society of Econometrics, and Brazilian Society of Mathematics. She was elected fellow of the Econometric Society in 2003 and international honorary member of the American Academy of Arts and Sciences in 2020.

Education
Sotomayor grew up in Rio de Janeiro, Brazil. She began her education at Federal University of Rio de Janeiro where she received her degree in Mathematics in 1967. Sotomayor continued her education at Institute of Pure and Applied Mathematics where she received her master's degree in Mathematics in 1972. She received her Ph.D. in Mathematics from Catholic University of Rio de Janeiro in 1981.

Areas of interest
Marilda Sotomayor specializes in game theory, matching markets, and market design. She is the only expert in both game theory and matching markets in Brazil.

Personal
Sotomayor married Jorge Sotomayor and had two children, a son and a daughter.

Selected works

References

External links
 

1944 births
Living people
Brazilian mathematicians
Brazilian women economists
Brazilian women mathematicians
20th-century Brazilian economists
21st-century Brazilian economists
Game theorists
Federal University of Rio de Janeiro alumni
Pontifical Catholic University of Rio de Janeiro alumni
Academic staff of the University of São Paulo
Fellows of the Econometric Society
Fellows of the American Academy of Arts and Sciences